Cumberland Lodge is a 17th-century Grade II listed country house in Windsor Great Park 3.5 miles south of Windsor Castle. Since 1947 it has been occupied by the charitable foundation known as Cumberland Lodge, which holds residential conferences, lectures and discussions about social and ethical issues. The gardens of Cumberland Lodge are Grade I listed on the Register of Historic Parks and Gardens.

History of the building 
The house was built by John Byfield, an army captain, in 1650 when Oliver Cromwell divided up and sold off lots in Windsor Great Park. The house was called Byfield House until 1670. It was then renamed New Lodge, and at times was also known as Windsor Lodge or Ranger Lodge. After the Restoration, King Charles II made the house the official residence of the Ranger of the Great Park — a Crown appointment always held by someone close to the Sovereign.

Among those who have lived at the Lodge were:

 Baptist May, the first resident Ranger;
 Sarah Churchill, Duchess of Marlborough (1702–1744); John Churchill, 1st Duke of Marlborough who died there in 1722;
 John Spencer (1744–1746);
 Prince William, Duke of Cumberland, son of King George II (1746–1765);
 Prince Henry, Duke of Cumberland and Strathearn, son of Frederick, Prince of Wales (1765–1790);
 Anne, Duchess of Cumberland and Strathearn, widow of Henry (1790–1803);
 George Spencer-Churchill, 5th Duke of Marlborough (until 1822);
 Augustus Frederick, Duke of Sussex, son of King George III (1830–1843);
 General William Wemyss of Wemyss, Scottish soldier in the British Army and Member of Parliament died at the lodge in 1852;
 Princess Helena, daughter of Queen Victoria and wife of Prince Christian of Schleswig-Holstein (after their marriage in 1866);
 Lord Fitzalan of Derwent, last Viceroy of Ireland (1923–1947).

During 1936 Cumberland Lodge was used for meetings between Alexander Hardinge (the King's Private Secretary) and Stanley Baldwin (the Prime Minister), which eventually led to the abdication of Edward VIII.

History of the foundation 
In 1947 King George VI granted Cumberland Lodge to a new educational foundation, with Amy Buller as its Warden and Sir Walter Moberly as its Principal (1949–55). Buller had recently published her groundbreaking book, Darkness over Germany (1943), about the rise of Nazi sentiments among students and academics in Germany in the late 1930s.

The book impressed leading figures in a nation that was still at war, including Queen Elizabeth the Queen Mother, who invited Buller to Buckingham Palace in 1944 to discuss the lessons that could be learnt, to avoid a repeat of 1930s Germany. This led to a determination to set up a place where students, and those responsible for the guidance of young people, could meet to discuss the contributions that they could make, through their studies and future lives, to build a better society and secure a lasting peace. Amy Buller conceived of the idea of a residential centre where students could come with their teachers and, in a relaxed atmosphere, to consider important ethical and social issues outside the normal confines of their degree courses. This was established at the Lodge three years later.

The Queen became Patron of the new organisation, which was originally called the St Catharine’s Foundation and later (in 1968) became The King George VI and Queen Elizabeth Foundation of St Catharine. That remains the official name of the foundation to this day. In June 2005 a new incorporated charity, called simply Cumberland Lodge, assumed the operating role and assets of the foundation. However, the original charity continues to exist as the holder of the warrant for the property.

Following the death of The Queen Mother in 2002, Her Majesty the Queen became Patron of the charity in 2003.

Cumberland Lodge today 
Today Cumberland Lodge is an educational charity with a mission to empower people, through open dialogue and debate, to tackle the causes and effects of social division. It is used for academic workshops and short residential courses by groups of students, primarily from universities. 

Its charitable mission is supported by individuals and organisations who book the facilities for conferences, meetings, away-days, training courses and special events, as well as through donations and partnerships.

The building is not open to the general public for viewing; however, there are open days, conferences and free lectures throughout the year. 

Various interior and exterior shots of Lodge can be seen in the 2010 film The King's Speech.

Further reading

Articles 
 John Goodall, "Cumberland Lodge, Windsor: The royal seat of learning", Country Life, 4 February 2020.
 David Lee, Feature: Inside Cumberland Lodge, Windsor Express, 18 May 2018.
 Francis Batt, "How to disagree politely - at Windsor Great Park", Royal Borough Observer, 3 October 2020.
 Chandler Tregaskes, "How Edwardian high society pre-dated the internet's obsession with fabulous felines". The history of the high society cat fanciers inspired by Louis Wain. Tatler, 3 January 2022.
 Annie Goldsmith, "A Never-Before-Published Diary Reveals What Life Was Like for Queen Elizabeth in WWII". Excerpts from The Windsor Diaries about Queen Elizabeth & Princess Margaret]. Town & Country Magazine, 4 May 2021.

Notes 

Letter from Queen Elizabeth to Queen Mary, 13 November 1944, published in Counting One's Blessings, The Selected Letters of Queen Elizabeth The Queen Mother, William Shawcross (ed.), Macmillan, 2012, pp. 374–375.

External links 

 Cumberland Lodge website
 Royal Berkshire History information

1650 establishments in England
Buildings and structures in Windsor Great Park
Charities based in England
Country houses in Berkshire
Education in England
Exhibition and conference centres in England
Grade I listed parks and gardens in Berkshire
Grade II listed houses
Houses completed in 1650
Royal residences in England